Yanis Massolin (born 20 September 2002) is a French professional footballer who plays as a midfielder for Clermont in the French Ligue 1.

Professional career
Massolin is a youth product of the French clubs Moulins, Evian Thonon, and US Annemasse Gaillard, before finishing his youth training at the Swiss club Meyrin. On 10 July 2021, he joined Moulins Yzeure in the Championnat National 2 where he began his senior career. On 16 June 2022, he transferred to the Ligue 2 side Clermont. He made his professional debut with Clermont as a late substitute in a 3–1 loss to Brest on 23 October 2022.

Personal life
Massolin is the son of the former footballer Richard Massolin. Through his father, he is of Martiniquais and Spanish descent. He wears the number 97 as a nod to his Martiniquais roots, who's regional code is 972.

References

External links
 
 

2002 births
Living people
Sportspeople from Moulins, Allier
French footballers
French people of Martiniquais descent
French people of Spanish descent
Association football midfielders
Moulins Yzeure Foot players
Clermont Foot players
Ligue 1 players
Championnat National 2 players
Championnat National 3 players
French expatriate footballers
French expatriates in Switzerland
Expatriate footballers in Switzerland